Mittatmakur is a village  (with a gram panchayat) located at a distance of around 14 kilometers from Gudur, Nellore District, Andhra Pradesh. The village comes under Gudur constituency.

References 

Villages in Nellore district